All of the business loops are maintained by the Texas Department of Transportation (TxDOT). Interstate 45 (I-45) has four business loops in the state, all located in northern Texas. Along I-45, TxDOT identifies each business route as Business Interstate 45 followed by an alphabetic suffix. Along Texas Interstates, the alphabetic suffixes on business route names ascend eastward and northward. There are gaps in the alphabetic values to allow for future system expansion. The alphabetic naming suffixes are included as small letters on the bottom of route shields.

I-45 business routes generally follow the path of the former U.S. Highway 75 (US 75) through the central portions of towns now bypassed by the Interstate route.

Corsicana business loop

Business Interstate 45-F (Bus. I-45-F) is a business loop of I-45 that passes through Corsicana in Navarro County. The route begins at I-45 exit 228B and ends at exit 235 and travels along 7th Street. The highway has an intersection with Bus. U.S. Highway 287 (Bus. US 287) and an interchange with State Highway 31 (SH 31). 

The highway was designated in 1991 when State Highway Loop 564 (Loop 564) was decommissioned.

Junction list

Ennis business loop

Business Interstate 45-G (Bus. I-45-G) is a business loop of I-45 that passes through Ennis in Ellis County. The route begins at I-45 exit 249 (where Farm to Market Road 85 (FM 85) also begins) and ends at exit 253. The highway travels along Kaufman Street and has overlaps with Bus. US 287 and SH 34 and also has a major intersection with State Highway Spur 469 (Spur 469) and FM 1181.

The route was designated in 1991 when Spur 563 was decommissioned.

Junction list

Palmer business loop

Business Interstate 45-H (Bus. I-45-H) travels through Palmer in Ellis County. The route begins at I-45 exit 258 and ends at exit 260. The highway travels along Dallas Street and has a major intersection with FM 813. 

The highway was designated in 1991 when Loop 562 was decommissioned.

Junction list

Ferris business loop

Business Interstate 45-J (Bus. I-45-J) is a business loop of I-45 that passes through Ferris in Ellis County and also briefly travels through Wilmer in Dallas County. The highway begins at I-45 exit 265 and ends at exit 268. The road travels through Ferris along Central Street and has major intersections with FM 660 and FM 983.

The highway was designated in 1991 when Loop 560 was decommissioned.

Junction list

See also

References

45
Interstate 45
Interstate Highways in Texas